Amadis usually refers to the romance novel Amadis de Gaula. 

Amadis may also refer to:

Amadis of Greece, 1530 sequel by Feliciano de Silva to the novel Amadis de Gaula
Amadis (Lully), 1684 opera by Jean-Baptiste Lully
Amadis de Grèce, 1699 opera by André Cardinal Destouches
Amadigi di Gaula, 1715 opera by George Frideric Handel
Amadis de Gaule (La Borde and Berton), 1771 opera by Jean-Benjamin de La Borde and Pierre Montan Berton
Amadis de Gaule (J. C. Bach), 1779 opera by Johann Christian Bach
Amadis (Massenet), 1922 opera by Jules Massenet

See also
L'Amadigi, 1560 epic poem by Tasso